The cosmic age problem is a historical problem in astronomy concerning the age of the universe. The problem was that at various times in the 20th century, some objects in the universe were estimated to be older than the time elapsed since the Big Bang, as estimated from measurements of the expansion rate of the universe known as the Hubble constant, denoted H0. (This is more correctly called the Hubble parameter, since it generally varies with time).
If so, this would represent a contradiction, since objects such as galaxies, stars and planets could not have existed in the extreme temperatures and densities shortly after the Big Bang.

Since around 1997–2003, the problem is believed to have been solved by most cosmologists: modern cosmological measurements lead to a precise estimate of the age of the universe (i.e. time since the Big Bang) of 13.8 billion years, and recent age estimates for the oldest objects are either younger than this, or consistent allowing for measurement uncertainties.

Early years 

Following theoretical developments of the Friedmann equations by Alexander Friedmann and Georges Lemaître in the 1920s, and the discovery of the expanding universe by Edwin Hubble in 1929, it was immediately clear that tracing this expansion backwards in time predicts that the universe had almost zero size at a finite time in the past. This concept, initially known as the "Primeval Atom" by Lemaitre, was later elaborated into the modern Big Bang theory. If the universe had expanded at a constant rate in the past, the age of the universe now (i.e. the time since the Big Bang) is simply the inverse of the Hubble constant, often known as the Hubble time. For Big Bang models with zero cosmological constant and positive matter density, the actual age must be somewhat younger than this Hubble time; typically the age would be between 66% and 90% of the Hubble time, depending on the density of matter.

Hubble's early estimate of his constant was 550 (km/s)/Mpc, and the inverse of that is 1.8 billion years. It was believed by many geologists such as Arthur Holmes in the 1920s that the Earth was probably over 2 billion years old, but with large uncertainty. The possible discrepancy between the ages of the Earth and the universe was probably one motivation for the development of the Steady State theory in 1948 as an alternative to the Big Bang; in the (now obsolete) steady state theory, the universe is infinitely old and on average unchanging with time. The steady state theory postulated spontaneous creation of matter to keep the average density constant as the universe expands, and therefore most galaxies still have an age less than 1/H0. However, if H0 had been 550 (km/s)/Mpc, our Milky Way galaxy would be exceptionally large compared to most other galaxies, so it could well be much older than an average galaxy, therefore eliminating the age problem.

1950–1970 

In the 1950s, two substantial errors were discovered in Hubble's extragalactic distance scale: first in 1952, Walter Baade discovered there were two classes of Cepheid variable star. Hubble's sample comprised different classes nearby and in other galaxies, and correcting this error made all other galaxies twice as distant as Hubble's values, thus doubling the Hubble time. A second error was discovered by Allan Sandage and coworkers: for galaxies beyond the Local Group, Cepheids were too faint to observe with Hubble's instruments, so Hubble used the brightest stars as distance indicators. Many of Hubble's "brightest stars" were actually HII regions or clusters containing many stars, which caused another underestimation of distances for these more distant galaxies. Thus, in 1958 Sandage  published the first reasonably accurate measurement of the Hubble constant, at 75 (km/s)/Mpc, which is close to modern estimates of 68–74 (km/s)/Mpc.

The age of the Earth (actually the Solar System) was first accurately measured around 1955 by Clair Patterson at 4.55 billion years, essentially identical to the modern value. For H0 ~ 75 (km/s)/Mpc, the inverse of H0 is 13.0 billion years; so after 1958 the Big Bang model age was comfortably older than the Earth.

However, in the 1960s and onwards, new developments in the theory of stellar evolution enabled age estimates for large star clusters called globular clusters: these generally gave age estimates of around 15 billion years, with substantial scatter.  Further revisions of the Hubble constant by Sandage and Gustav Tammann in the 1970s gave values around 50–60 (km/s)/Mpc, and an inverse of 16-20 billion years, consistent with globular cluster ages.

1975–1990 

However, in the late 1970s to early 1990s, the age problem re-appeared: new estimates of the Hubble constant gave higher values, with Gerard de Vaucouleurs estimating values 90–100 (km/s)/Mpc, while Marc Aaronson and co-workers gave values around 80-90  (km/s)/Mpc. Sandage and Tammann continued to argue for values 50–60, leading to a period of controversy sometimes called the "Hubble wars". The higher values for H0 appeared to predict a universe younger than the globular cluster ages, and gave rise to some speculations during the 1980s that the Big Bang model was seriously incorrect.

Late 1990s: probable solution 

The age problem was eventually thought to be resolved by several developments between 1995 and 2003: firstly, a large program with the Hubble Space Telescope measured the Hubble constant at 72 (km/s)/Mpc with 10 percent uncertainty. Secondly, measurements of parallax by the Hipparcos spacecraft in 1995 revised globular cluster distances upwards by 5-10 percent; this made their stars brighter than previously estimated and therefore younger, shifting their age estimates down to around 12-13 billion years. Finally, from 1998 to 2003 a number of new cosmological observations including supernovae, cosmic microwave background observations and large galaxy redshift surveys led to the acceptance of dark energy and the establishment of the Lambda-CDM model as the standard model of cosmology. The presence of dark energy implies that the universe was expanding more slowly at around half its present age than today, which makes the universe older for a given value of the Hubble constant.  The combination of the three results above essentially removed the discrepancy between estimated globular cluster ages and the age of the universe.

More recent measurements from WMAP and the Planck spacecraft lead to an estimate of the age of the universe of 13.80 billion years  with only 0.3 percent uncertainty (based on the standard Lambda-CDM model), and modern age measurements for globular clusters  and other objects are currently smaller than this value (within the measurement uncertainties). A substantial majority of cosmologists therefore believe the age problem is now resolved.

New research from teams, including one led by Nobel laureate Adam Riess of the Space Telescope Science Institute in Baltimore, has found the universe to be between 12.5 and 13 billion years old, disagreeing with the Planck findings. Whether this stems merely from errors in data gathering, or is related to the as yet unexplained aspects of physics, such as Dark Energy or Dark Matter, has yet to be confirmed.

References

External links 
 http://map.gsfc.nasa.gov/universe/uni_age.html

Obsolete scientific theories
Physical cosmology